The 2002 African Cup Winners' Cup football club tournament was won by Wydad AC in two-legged final victory against Asante Kotoko This was the twenty-eighth season that the tournament took place for the winners of each African country's domestic cup. Thirty-seven sides entered the competition. Three teams were disqualified for not showing up during the different stages of the competition, starting with Togolese side Sara Sport who failed to arrive for the 1st leg of the preliminary round, then South Africans Kaizer Chiefs who failed to arrive for the 2nd leg of the first round and finally the Réunion representative Jeanne d'Arc who failed to show up for their 2nd leg match of the second round. The last two teams both failed to show up for their 2nd leg match against the Malagasy side US Transfoot.

Preliminary round

|}

Notes
1 Sara Sport failed to arrive for 1st leg.

First round

|}

Notes
1 Kaizer Chiefs did not arrive for 2nd leg in Tamatave, claiming transport problems, and were disqualified.
2 AS Vita Club arrived late for 1st leg scheduled for Mar 9, claiming not to have been aware it was not on Mar 10; CAF rescheduled the tie for Mar 30 and Apr 14, ruling both parties were to blame for insufficient communication.

Second round

|}

Notes
1 SS Jeanne d'Arc did not show for 2nd leg and were disqualified.

Quarter-finals 

|}

Semi-finals 

|}

Final

Wydad Casablanca won on away goals (2–2 on aggregate).

Champion

External links
 Results available on CAF Official Website
 Results available on RSSSF

African Cup Winners' Cup
2